Muttam or Muttom (മുട്ടം) may refer to:

Places in India
 Muttom, Ernakulam, a district in Kerala and location of Muttom metro station
 Muttam, Kannur, a district in Kerala
 Muttom, Kanyakumari, a district in Tamil Nadu
 Muttom, Thodupuzha, a district in Idukki, Kerala
 Muttam, Cherthala, a church's name in Alappuzha district in kerala

See also
 Muttampalam, a village in Kottayam district, Kerala